Kariakoo is a ward in the Ilala District of Dar es Salaam, Tanzania. It has a population of 9,405 (2002). The name derives from a corruption of the British "Carrier Corps", that used to be based in this area. Today, Kariakoo is mainly known for its extensive market, that spans several city blocks.

History

In pre-colonial times there was a large village in the area now known as Kariakoo. This village was frequently raided by slave traders. In the latter half of the 19th century, the area became a shamba (farm) belonging to the Sultan of Zanzibar. During German rule, 200 hectares of the shamba were bought by a German businessman named Schoeller, who rented the land to the Africans. At the same time, Dar es Salaam began to grow, and while Europeans built their houses in exclusive areas such as Oyster Bay, Kariakoo became Dar's main African settlement. In 1913, 15.000 out of the total 24.000 African inhabitants of Dar lived in Kariakoo.

In 1914 the German administration bought Kariakoo from Schoeller, with the intent of creating a formal African township according to the general segregationist strategy being applied German East Africa. Concrete houses were built to accommodate the African population, and at that same time the market was established; yet, the advent of First World War delayed its actual opening.

In 1916 the British conquered Dar es Salaam, and Kariakoo was used as a base for the Carrier Corps.

In 1923 the market built by the Germans finally began to function. In the 1970s it was substantially restructured.

Economy and infrastructure
Kariakoo hosts an extensive market which is a major contribution to Dar es Salaam's economy. The market is located on 67 Swahili Street. Kariakoo also hosts the Tanzania Postal Bank on Msimbazi Street.

Kariakoo Market
It is the busiest and the biggest market that contributes substantially to Dar es Salaam's food provision as well as a small-scale economy. Until recently Kariakoo was also one of the main dala dala "stations" in Dar es Salaam, although this has now been moved to south east of Mawasiliano as the Mawasiliano bus terminal.

Seeing how well the business is going. The Kariakoo Market Corp are soon set to open another new market at Mbezi Beach area at the cost of Sh500m.

Sports
Kariakoo hosts the Jakaya Mrisho Kikwete Youth Park and the Simba Sports Club.

Transport

Kariakoo has good transport amenities and close to the Julius Nyerere International Airport serving Dar es Salaam.

Below are two of the transport amenities very close to Kariakoo.

Bus 
Kariakoo has good transport links due to the Dar es Salaam bus rapid transit service offered just outside of the ward.

Railway Links 
Kariakoo is served by the Kamata Train Station located on Msimbazi Street just outside of the ward.

References

External links
Kariakoo Area Description

Dar es Salaam
Ilala District
Wards of Dar es Salaam Region